Absurd or The Absurd may refer to:

Entertainment
 Absurd (band), German metal band from the 1990s
 "Absurd", a 1997 song by Fluke, from the album Risotto
 "Absurd" (song), a 2021 song by Guns N' Roses
 Theatre of the Absurd, art form utilizing the philosophy of Absurdism
 Absurd (film), 1981 Italian film
 Absurd or surreal humour
 Absurdist fiction

Philosophy
 Absurdity, general and technical usage—associated with extremely poor reasoning, the ridiculous, or nonsense
 Absurdism, a philosophy based on the belief that the universe is irrational and meaningless
 Absurd, a term used in logic to describe a contradiction
 Reductio ad absurdum, a type of logical argument